The Housing and Home Finance Agency (HHFA) was responsible for the principal housing programs of the United States from 1947 to 1965. It was superseded by the U.S. Department of Housing and Urban Development and preceded by the National Housing Agency.

Organizational history 
HHFA was established as a permanent agency by Reorganization Plan No. 3 of 1947, effective July 24, 1947, replacing the National Housing Agency. Initially consisted of Federal Housing Administration, Public Housing Administration, and Federal Home Loan Bank Board, the last of which separated from HHFA in 1955. It acquired the Federal National Mortgage Association from the Federal Loan Agency as a constituent unit in 1950. The HHFA Division of Community Facilities and Operations and HHFA Division of Slum Clearance and Urban Redevelopment were redesignated the Community Facilities Administration and Urban Renewal Administration and elevated to constituent unit status in 1954. The Federal Flood Indemnity Administration operated as a HHFA constituent unit from 1956 to 1957. HHFA was superseded by the Department of Housing and Urban Development in 1965.

References 

 

Public housing in the United States
Defunct agencies of the United States government